Conquest is a village in the Canadian province of Saskatchewan within the Rural Municipality of Fertile Valley No. 285 and Census Division No. 12.

History 
Conquest incorporated as a village on October 24, 1911.

Demographics 

Arts and culture 
Conquest was the setting for the 1998 film Conquest.

See also 
 List of communities in Saskatchewan
 Villages of Saskatchewan

References

Villages in Saskatchewan
Fertile Valley No. 285, Saskatchewan
Division No. 12, Saskatchewan